John Steven Wooley (born April 4, 1949) is a writer, novelist, historian, lecturer, filmmaker, and radio and TV host who specializes in the movies, literature, and music of the 1930s and ‘40s as well as other pop-culture history.

He has written, co-written, or edited more than 50 books, including the 1930's-set epistolary horror trilogy The Cleansing (consisting of Seventh Sense, Satan's Swine, and Sinister Serpent), with Robert A. Brown; Right Down the Middle, the as-told-to biography of famed New York Yankees pitcher Ralph Terry, a northeastern Oklahoma boy who went on to become 1962 World Series MVP; the critically acclaimed biography of moviemaker Wes Craven, The Man and His Nightmares; and Shot in Oklahoma, a look at Sooner State-lensed pictures that was named Best Book on Oklahoma History for 2011 by the Oklahoma Historical Society.

He and collaborator Brett Bingham have written two nonfiction entertainment books: Thanks – Thanks A Lot, the as-told-to biography of American country music disc jockey and singer Billy Parker, and Twentieth-Century Honky-Tonk, a history of Cain's Ballroom, an historic music venue in Tulsa, Oklahoma.

His novel Old Fears, written with Ron Wolfe, is in active development at Sony Pictures Television. In November 2021, Babylon Books released a special 40th anniversary edition, with new material by the authors.

Wooley was also guest curator for an Oklahoma History Center exhibit, Oklahoma@ the Movies, and is currently working with former OHC executive director Dr. Bob Blackburn and members of the Oklahoma Military Academy Alumni Association on a newly refurbished state-of-the-art museum.

As of late 2022, he was working on two different documentary films: Tulsa Terrors, a look at the Tulsa-shot made-for-video horror movies of the late 20th century, and Tulsa Sound: The First Wave, about Oklahoma’s rock ‘n’ roll originators. His other documentaries include the Learning Channel special Hauntings across America and the recent Oklahoma Military Academy: The West Point of the Southwest. He also wrote the made-for-TV feature Dan Turner — Hollywood Detective, starring Marc Singer, Tracy Scoggins, and Arte Johnson, as well as the award-winning independent movie Cafe Purgatory. His scripting extends to comic books and graphic novels, including Plan Nine from Outer Space, Grateful Dead Comix, and Death Rattle, along with The Twilight Avenger and Miracle Squad series, which he co-created with artist Terry Tidwell.

An entertainment writer for the Tulsa World newspaper for 23 years (1983-2006), Wooley has seen his articles and interviews appear in a wide range of other publications, from TV Guide to the horror-movie magazine Fangoria, for which he wrote more than 100 pieces.

He is also the producer and host of the highly rated Swing on This, Tulsa’s only western-swing radio program, heard every Saturday night on NPR affiliate KWGS (89.5 FM); it won an Outstanding Special Programming Award from the Oklahoma Association of Broadcasters in 2012. With Michael H. Price and producer-engineer Joey Hambrick, he co-hosts the Forgotten Horrors podcasts. Wooley is executive producer, writer, co-producer, and co-host of the public-television series Film Noir Theatre, which is currently in its seventh season on RSU TV.

His work in music extends to songwriting and performing: “Gone Away,” which he co-wrote with Steve Ripley and Tim DuBois, was the first single from Ripley's 2003 solo disc, receiving international airplay. Later, it was covered for the country market by Bill Anderson with the Oak Ridge Boys. He has played Vox organ on discs by Ripley, the Red Dirt Rangers, and others. Currently, he works with the proto-psychedelic '60s band The Moody Dudes.

Columns
 Tulsa World (1984–2006)
 Fangoria (at least as early as 1986)

Comic books
 Miracle Squad (1986–89)
 Uncanny Man-Frog (1987)
 Twilight Avenger (1987–89)
 Plan Nine from Outer Space (graphic novel) (1990)
 Plan Nine from Outer Space: Thirty Years Later (1991)

Films
 Dan Turner, Hollywood Detective (1990)
 Cafe Purgatory (1991)

Non-fiction books
 Big Book of Biker Flicks (2005)
 Fantasies in the Sand: Birth of the Beach Party Box-Office Bonanza (2018)
 From the Blue Devils to Red Dirt: The Colors of Oklahoma Music (2006)
 Shot in Oklahoma: A Century of Sooner State Cinema (2011)
 Voices From the Hill: The Story of Oklahoma Military Academy (2005)
 Wes Craven: The Man and his Nightmares (2011)

Novels
 Old Fears (with Ron Wolfe)
 Dark Within (2000)
 Awash in the Blood (2001)
  Ghost Band (2006)
 Seventh Sense: The Cleansing: Book 1 (with Robert A. Brown) (2019)
 Satan's Swine: The Cleansing: Book 2 (with Robert A. Brown) (2019)
 Sinister Serpent: The Cleansing: Book 3 (with Robert A. Brown) (2020)

Collections
 Doctor Coffin: The Living Dead Man, by Perley Poore Sheehan (Off-Trail Publications, 2007)
 Super-Detective Flip Book: Two Complete Novels, Victor Rousseau, Robert Leslie Bellem and W.T. Ballard (with John McMahan) (Off-Trail Publications, 2008)
 Thrilling Detective Heroes (2007) [ed. with John Locke]

Radio
Swing on This (KWGS 89.5 FM)

References

External links
 
 
 John Wooley at Oklahoma Crossroads

20th-century American novelists
21st-century American novelists
American columnists
American documentary filmmakers
American male journalists
American male novelists
American radio personalities
American male screenwriters
Writers from Saint Paul, Minnesota
1949 births
Living people
20th-century American male writers
21st-century American male writers
Novelists from Minnesota
20th-century American non-fiction writers
21st-century American non-fiction writers
Screenwriters from Minnesota